Jock Morison (5 December 1915 – 10 March 1991) was an Australian rules footballer who played with Collingwood in the Victorian Football League (VFL).

Morison later served in the Australian Army during World War II, spending time in north Borneo in 1945.

Notes

External links 

		
Profile on Collingwood Forever

1915 births
1991 deaths
Australian rules footballers from Victoria (Australia)
Collingwood Football Club players